The Sayre Downtown Historic District is a commercial historic district located in downtown Sayre, Oklahoma. The district comprises a three-block area of Main and 4th Streets; it includes 39 buildings, of which 24 are contributing buildings. The oldest buildings in the district date from between 1903 and 1909, when a building boom replaced Sayre's frame downtown buildings with brick Commercial style structures. By the 1920s, the downtown area had reached its current size, and most of the buildings in the district had been built. In the 1920s, U.S. Route 66 was routed through the district, increasing traffic for local businesses. Sayre's Classical Revival post office, a contributing property, was constructed in 1938; the post office includes a Works Progress Administration mural painted in 1940. The downtown remained prosperous until the 1950s, when population decline and the bypassing of Route 66 led to a decrease in commercial activity.

NRHP Listing
The district was added to the National Register of Historic Places on December 9, 2002. It qualified under Categories A and C. No properties within the District have been individually listed on the NRHP.

References

Buildings and structures in Beckham County, Oklahoma
Historic districts on the National Register of Historic Places in Oklahoma
National Register of Historic Places in Beckham County, Oklahoma